Tsumcorite is a rare hydrated lead arsenate mineral that was discovered in 1971, and reported by Geier, Kautz and Muller. It was named after the TSUMeb CORporation  mine at Tsumeb, in Namibia, in recognition of the Corporation's support for mineralogical investigations of the orebody at its Mineral Research Laboratory.

Unit cell 
Tsumcorite belongs to the monoclinic crystal class 2/m, which means that it has a twofold axis of symmetry along the b axis and a mirror plane perpendicular to this, in the plane containing the a and c axes.  The a and c axes are inclined to each other at angle β = 115.3°.  The unit cell parameters are a = 9.124 Å to 9.131 Å, b = 6.326 Å to 6.329 Å and c = 7.577 Å to 7.583 Å. There are two formula units per unit cell (Z = 2), and the space group is C2/m, meaning that the cell is a C-face centred lattice, with lattice points in the center of the C face as well as at the corners of the cell. The structure is related to the brackebushite group structure.

Mineral series 
Tsumcorite belongs to the helmutwinklerite group, whose members are
tsumcorite PbZnFe2+(AsO4)2.H2O
helmutwinklerite PbZn2(AsO4)2.2H2O
thometzekite PbCu2+2(AsO4)2.2H2O
mawbyite PbFe3+2(AsO4)2(OH)2
Tsumcorite forms a series with helmutwinklerite as Zn replaces the Fe2+, with thometzekite as Cu replaces the Zn and Fe2+, and also with mawbyite.

Crystal habit and properties 
Crystals are prismatic, elongated along the b axis, or wedge-shaped.  They occur in radiating sheaves and spherulites, and as fibrous crusts or earthy and powdery material.   Cleavage is good perpendicular to the c axis, and twinning is common.

Tsumcorite is yellow-brown, red-brown or orange in color, and it is one of the few minerals that have a yellow streak (orpiment and crocoite are two others).  It is translucent, with a vitreous luster, and dichroic yellow to yellow-green. The optical class is biaxial and the refractive indices are approximately equal to 1.90.

It dissolves in hydrochloric acid and it is not radioactive.

Occurrence and associations 
Tsumcorite is a rare secondary mineral in the oxidized zone of some arsenic-bearing hydrothermal lead-zinc deposits.

The type locality is the Tsumeb Mine, Tsumeb, Otjikoto Region, Namibia, where it is associated with willemite, smithsonite, mimetite, scorodite, anglesite, arseniosiderite, beaverite, beudantite, carminite, ludlockite, o'danielite, zincroselite, stranskiite and leiteite.  At the Puttapa Mine in Australia it occurs with adamite, mimetite, smithsonite, goethite and quartz. At the  Kintore Open Cut, Broken Hill, Australia it occurs with segnitite, beudantite, carminite and mawbyite.

References 

Arsenate minerals
Lead minerals
Zinc minerals
Iron(II) minerals
Monoclinic minerals
Minerals in space group 12
Minerals described in 1971